Figueirão is a municipality located in the Brazilian state of Mato Grosso do Sul. Its population was 3,059 (2020).

References

Municipalities in Mato Grosso do Sul